Abubakar Umar Memorial Stadium is a multi-use stadium in Gombe, Gombe State, Nigeria.  It has a capacity of 10,000 people, is currently used mostly for football matches and it used to be the home stadium of Gombe United F.C. The state government is planning on replacing it with a new modern stadium that will cost 3 billion naira. 

Football venues in Nigeria
Gombe State